"What's Your Number?" is a single by the American hip hop group Cypress Hill featuring Tim Armstrong. It was released in 2004 and featured a rerecorded bassline from "The Guns of Brixton" by The Clash.

Video
The music video for the song was directed by Dean Karr and had guest appearances from Slash, Everlast, Tim Armstrong, Travis Barker, Skinhead Rob, Nadja Peulen, Xzibit, Gary Dourdan, Fredwreck and Wilmer Valderrama and Bobby Alt of Street Drum Corps

Chart performance
"What's Your Number?" reached number 8 in the RIANZ charts, the group's fourth top 10 in New Zealand. At that time it was the group's second song to chart in the US Modern Rock chart, peaking at number No. 23.

Charts

Release history

References

Cypress Hill songs
2004 singles
2004 songs
Ruffhouse Records singles
Songs written by Paul Simonon
Songs written by DJ Muggs
Songs written by B-Real
Song recordings produced by DJ Muggs